Kurdi or Curdi is a village in Sanguem taluka of Goa. The village was submerged in the 1980s by the reservoir of the Salaulim Dam. Every year, at the peak of summer during April-May, parts of the submerged village rise above the water level for around one month. During this period, the original villagers come back to relive their memories and gather around their respective places of worship. Most of the villagers were rehabilitated to the nearby villages of Valkinim and Vaddem, and have since spread all across Goa.

Location
The village is located in Sanguem taluka, and is accessible by bike via the Curchorem-Ponda road.

History

Kurdi was a prosperous agricultural village with a population of approximately 3,000. It had a main Hindu temple, smaller temples, a Christian chapel, and a Muslim shrine.

In the 1960s, Dayanand Bandodkar, the then Chief Minister of Goa, decided to build the Salaulim dam to supply water to a large part of the state. Understanding that the villages of Curdi and Kurpem would be submerged by the reservoir, he offered the villagers rehabilitation in the nearby villages of Valkinim and Vaddem. With all plans in place, the people of Curdi began moving out by 1971, making way for the construction of the dam by 1975.

The reservoir submergence involved 20 villages which were partially or fully submerged. 3000 people (over 450 families) were displaced and resettled. The relocation was done by dismantling of the original temple and then reassembling it at the new location after methodically numbering each stone, over a period of 11 years.

The canal's water was diverted by bunding it annually, until a man named Bosle built the permanent Bosle bund 150 years ago.  

Devabhag, Stristal, Karemal, Unan, Akrimal, Dhapode, Talsai and Kaman, among others, were the various smaller colonies of the village. Of these, Talsai and about half of Kurpem were not submerged by the reservoir.

The temple's existence was not known as it was covered with thick vegetation before the submergence of the village.

Aftermath
In the initial days of relocation, the original inhabitants of Curdi village had to survive in rehabilitation homes provided by the government in the town of Vaddem. To date, they face problems with drinking water, irrigation, healthcare, employment, network coverage and electricity. This is partly due to the fact that the village does not receive water from the Salaulim Dam project.

Annual gathering
When parts of the submerged village appear above the water level during May, the original inhabitants go back with their families to picnic at the various standing structures of the village. They celebrate the feast of a chapel, which lies just above the water line on a hillock. The original villagers also celebrate the utsava of the Someshwar Temple in this village. A Muslim shrine is also present here.

Documentary
In 2016, young filmmaker Saumyananda Sahi chose to make a documentary about the village, after reading the thesis on the village written by Venisha Fernandes, whose family originally hails from the village. Fernandes chose her ancestral village as the subject for her dissertation as part of her Masters in Sociology at Goa University. Titled Remembering Kurdi, it is produced by the Films Division of India and has interviews of the original inhabitants interspersed with the scenery of the village when it is above the water level in May. It also has excerpts from a film shot at the village in 1977 by Vinay Dhumale, titled Gana Tapaswini. It features the Someshwar temple, the house of Mogubai Kurdikar, and village plantations. Sahi also organised a screening of the film for the original inhabitants living at Vaddem.

Notable individuals
 Mogubai Kurdikar
 Kishori Amonkar

Gallery

See also
 Salaulim Dam

References

External links
 
 
 

Villages in South Goa district
Submerged places